John Lomas (1920–2019) was an RAF intelligence officer during the Second World War, when he decoded German communications at Bletchley Park.  After the war, he became a senior officer in the Immigration Service.

References

 1920 births
2019 deaths
Royal Air Force personnel of World War II